KD Mahawangsa is a Royal Malaysian Navy 4,300-ton multi-role support ship based at Lumut Naval Base in Perak, Malaysia. It was named in honor of Merong Mahawangsa, the founder of the Old Kedah. KD stands for Kapal DiRaja which means His Majesty's Ship in the Malay language.

Major operation
The ship has been dispatched to aid victims of the 2004 Indian Ocean earthquake, rushed humanitarian aid to Afghan refugees in 2001, and delivered armoured infantry vehicles from 4th Infantry Brigade (Mech) as part of peacekeeper forces for Operation Astute during the 2006 East Timor crisis.

In her roles as a command ship, KD Mahawangsa has been involved in several joint exercises with foreign navies, such as the joint Malaysia-Thailand Naval exercises called THALAY LAUT, the Starfish exercises under the Five Power Defence Arrangement and the Cooperation Afloat Readiness and Training (CARAT) series of exercises held with the U.S. Navy. The closing ceremony for CARAT Malaysia 2004 was held aboard KD Mahawangsa, anchored off the island of Tioman.

In September 2008 KD Mahawangsa was sent to the Gulf of Aden after the hijacking of two MISC oil tankers by Somali pirates.

References

External links
 KD MAHAWANGSA at Royal Malaysian Navy Homepage

Sri Indera Sakti-class support ships
1983 ships
Ships built in Bremen (state)